Limnocottus griseus is a species of ray-finned fish belonging to the family Cottidae, the typical sculpins. It was described by Dmitrii Nikolaevich Taliev in 1955, originally as a subspecies of Abyssocottus godlewskii. It is a freshwater fish which is endemic to Lake Baikal, Russia. It is known to dwell at a depth range of 250–1300 metres.

References

griseus
Fish of Lake Baikal
Fish described in 1955
Taxa named by Dmitrii Nikolaevich Taliev